The Capt. Josiah Pratt House is a historic house at 141 East Street in Foxboro, Massachusetts.  It is a -story wood-frame house, five bays wide, with a hip roof, central chimney, and clapboard siding.  Its centered entrance is set in a projecting gable-roofed vestibule.  The house was built c. 1760, and is a well-preserved example of Georgian architecture.  The house was owned by Captain Josiah Pratt, a local military leader during the American Revolutionary War and a locally prominent citizen.  He, and also some of his descendants, served as town selectman.

The house was listed on the National Register of Historic Places in 1983.

See also
National Register of Historic Places listings in Norfolk County, Massachusetts

References

Houses in Norfolk County, Massachusetts
Buildings and structures in Foxborough, Massachusetts
Houses on the National Register of Historic Places in Norfolk County, Massachusetts
Georgian architecture in Massachusetts